Hans-Christian Nehammer (born 26 May 1976) is an Austrian sailor, who specialized in the keelboat (Star) class. Together with his partner and five-time Olympian Hans Spitzauer, he was named one of the country's top sailors in the all-male keelboat for the 2008 Summer Olympics, finishing in twelfth place. A seven-time Austrian champion in his pet event, Nehammer sailed all of his sporting career for the Union Yacht Club in Attersee.

Nehammer competed for the Austrian sailing squad, as a 32-year-old crew member in the Star class, at the 2008 Summer Olympics in Beijing. After missing the Olympic cut at the Worlds in 2007, he and skipper Spitzauer rebounded from their flimsy outcome in Cascais to punch the last of the four remaining tickets vying for qualification with a successful top 16 finish at the class-associated Worlds in Miami. The Austrian duo accumulated a triad of top-six marks throughout the ten-race course, but a disastrous feat on the last leg slipped their chances away from the medal round to the twelfth overall spot with 87 net points.

Christian Nehammer competed as skipper in the Star class between 2009 and 2019 in many European Championships and World championships, scoring several top 10 places together with Florian Urban.
In 2019 Christian Nehammer switched back to sailing as a crew and won the Eastern Hemisphere Championship in his home waters together with Augie Diaz. In 2020 Spitzauer and Nehammer scored 3rd at the Star class European Championship, 2021 they managed to claim the 3rd position at the World championship in Kiel.

In parallel to his sports career Christian Nehammer finished his studies on economics at Innbruck university in 2002. He started his professional career at mobile operator in telecom industry. In 2009 Christian Nehammer started to work for a Belarusian operation building up and heading the financial controlling department until 2011. In 2011 he took over a managerial function in A1 Telecom Austria in procurement. Before leaving the company Christian Nehammer was responsible for the largest savings activity in Telecom Austria group in 2014. He changed to a mid-size company with 200m yearly turnover as CFO.
2018 Christian Nehammer left the company and started his own consulting business under the brand Konsultori. The core service  is that his company offers the "outsourced financial department" to small and mid sized companies.

Achievements

References

External links
 
 
 
 

1976 births
Living people
Austrian male sailors (sport)
Olympic sailors of Austria
Sailors at the 2008 Summer Olympics – Star
Sportspeople from Salzburg